Sodium cyanide is a poisonous compound with the formula NaCN. It is a white, water-soluble solid. Cyanide has a high affinity for metals, which leads to the high toxicity of this salt. Its main application, in gold mining, also exploits its high reactivity toward metals. It is a moderately strong base.

Production and chemical properties
Sodium cyanide is produced by treating hydrogen cyanide with sodium hydroxide:
HCN  +  NaOH   →   NaCN  +  H2O
Worldwide production was estimated at 500,000 tons in the year 2006. Formerly it was prepared by the Castner process involving the reaction of sodium amide with carbon at elevated temperatures.
 NaNH2  +  C   →   NaCN  +  H2

The structure of solid NaCN is related to that of sodium chloride. The anions and cations are each six-coordinate. Potassium cyanide (KCN) adopts a similar structure.  

When treated with acid, it forms the toxic gas hydrogen cyanide:
 NaCN + H+  →  HCN + Na+

Because the salt is derived from a weak acid, sodium cyanide readily reverts to HCN by hydrolysis; the moist solid emits small amounts of hydrogen cyanide, which is thought to smell like bitter almonds (not everyone can smell it—the ability thereof is due to a genetic trait).  Sodium cyanide reacts rapidly with strong acids to release hydrogen cyanide. This dangerous process represents a significant risk associated with cyanide salts. It is detoxified most efficiently with hydrogen peroxide (H2O2) to produce sodium cyanate (NaOCN) and water:
NaCN  +  H2O2  →  NaOCN  +  H2O

Applications

Cyanide mining

Gold cyanidation (also known as the cyanide process) is the dominant technique for extracting gold, much of which is obtained from low-grade ore. More than 70% of cyanide consumption globally is used for this purpose.  The  application exploits the high affinity of gold(I) for cyanide, which induces gold metal to oxidize and dissolve in the presence of air (oxygen) and water, producing the salt sodium dicyanoaurate:
4Au  +  8NaCN  +  O2  +  2H2O  →  4Na[Au(CN)2]  +  4NaOH

A similar process uses potassium cyanide (KCN, a close relative of sodium cyanide) to produce potassium dicyanoaurate (KAu(CN)2).

Chemical feedstock
Several commercially significant chemical compounds are derived from cyanide, including cyanuric chloride, cyanogen chloride, and many nitriles. In organic synthesis, cyanide, which is classified as a strong nucleophile, is used to prepare nitriles, which occur widely in many chemicals, including pharmaceuticals. Illustrative is the synthesis of benzyl cyanide by the reaction of benzyl chloride and sodium cyanide.

Niche uses
Being highly toxic, sodium cyanide is used to kill or stun rapidly such as in collecting jars used by entomologists and in widely illegal cyanide fishing.

Toxicity

Sodium cyanide, like other soluble cyanide salts, is among the most rapidly acting of all known poisons. NaCN is a potent inhibitor of respiration, acting on mitochondrial cytochrome oxidase and hence blocking electron transport. This results in decreased oxidative metabolism and oxygen utilization. Lactic acidosis then occurs as a consequence of anaerobic metabolism. An oral dosage as small as 200–300 mg can be fatal.

References

External links
 Institut national de recherche et de sécurité (INRS), "Cyanure de sodium. Cyanure de potassium", Fiche toxicologique n° 111, Paris, 2006, 6 pp. (PDF file, in French)
 International Chemical Safety Card 1118
 Hydrogen cyanide and cyanides (CICAD 61)
 National Pollutant Inventory - Cyanide compounds fact sheet
 NIOSH Pocket Guide to Chemical Hazards
 
 
 CSST (Canada)
 Sodium cyanide hazards to fish and other wildlife from gold

Cyanides
Photographic chemicals
Sodium compounds